Slobodan Dijaković (Слободан Дијаковић, born 7 July 1947) is a Yugoslav former swimmer. He competed in two events at the 1964 Summer Olympics.

References

1947 births
Living people
Croatian male swimmers
Yugoslav male swimmers
Olympic swimmers of Yugoslavia
Swimmers at the 1964 Summer Olympics
Sportspeople from Split, Croatia